Brett Cooper may refer to:

 Brett Cooper (footballer) (born 1959), Australian rules footballer
 Brett Cooper (fighter) (born 1987), American mixed martial artist
 Brett Cooper (born 2001), commentator

See also
 Bret Cooper (born 1970), American football player